Tinagaran a/l Baskeran (born 2 April 1991) is a Malaysian footballer who plays for Petaling Jaya City as a centre back.

References

External links
 

1991 births
Living people
Malaysian footballers
Malaysian people of Indian descent
Association football defenders
Malaysia Super League players
Malaysia Premier League players
Petaling Jaya City FC players